Franc Fridl (born 22 July 1972) is a Slovenian football manager and former player. He spent most of his career playing for Maribor in the Slovenian PrvaLiga. He also played for Olimpija.

Honours
Maribor
Slovenian Championship: 1996–97, 1997–98, 1998–99
Slovenian Cup: 1991–92, 1996–97, 1998–99

Olimpija
Slovenian Cup: 1999–2000

Zavrč
Slovenian Third League: 2011–12
Slovenian Fourth Division: 2010–11
Slovenian Fifth Division: 2009–10
Slovenian Sixth Division: 2008–09

Drava Ptuj
Slovenian Fourth Division: 2012–13

References

External links
NZS profile 
NK Maribor profile 

1972 births
Living people
People from Ptuj
Yugoslav footballers
Slovenian footballers
Association football midfielders
Slovenian PrvaLiga players
NK Maribor players
NK Aluminij players
NK Olimpija Ljubljana (1945–2005) players
NK Ljubljana players
NK Mura players
Slovenian expatriate footballers
Expatriate footballers in Austria
Slovenian expatriate sportspeople in Austria
NK Drava Ptuj players
NK Zavrč players
NK Drava Ptuj (2004) players
Slovenian football managers